This is a list of settlements in Nottinghamshire by population based on the results of the 2011 census. The next United Kingdom census will take place in 2021. In 2011, there were 34 built-up area subdivisions with 5,000 or more inhabitants in Nottinghamshire, shown in the table below.

List of settlements

Notes:

See also
List of places in Nottinghamshire
List of civil parishes in Nottinghamshire
Nottingham Built-up Area

References

External links
Link to ONS built up area statistics

 
Settlements
Nottinghamshire